Calisto muripetens is a butterfly of the family Nymphalidae. It is endemic to Cuba, where it is only known from a few localities in the central Cuban mountains: the Guamuhaya massif, above 750 meters and up to 1,140 meters on Pico San Juan, the highest peak. The species inhabits evergreen forests of the mogotes vegetation complex, limestone hills of vertical slopes, and rainforests, flying mostly in shady places.

The length of the forewings is 18–22 mm for males and 20–23 mm for females.

References

Calisto (butterfly)
Butterflies of Cuba
Endemic fauna of Cuba
Butterflies described in 1939